"Mothers Pride" (spelled without an apostrophe on the CD caddy) is a song written and performed by George Michael and released on Epic Records in 1991. It was released as the US B-side for the single "Waiting for That Day".

The track gained significant airplay in the United States during the first Gulf War in 1991, where radio stations often mixed in caller tributes to soldiers with the music. It peaked at number 46 on the Hot 100 chart on release in March 1991.

While video clips were released for the previous two singles from Listen Without Prejudice Vol. 1, no video clip was released for this single.

Charts

References

George Michael songs
Songs written by George Michael
Song recordings produced by George Michael
Pop ballads
1990 songs
1990s ballads